Jyotirmoyee Sikdar (born 11 December 1969) is an Indian politician and former sportswoman. She served as member of parliament of the Communist Party of India (Marxist) from the Krishnagar constituency in the 14th Lok Sabha. She was defeated in the 2009 Indian general election by the actor turned politician Tapas Paul of the Trinamool Congress. She had been reportedly inactive in politics following her defeat. In 2019, she herself pledged support to the All India Trinamool Congress and then joined the Bharatiya Janata Party in the following year.

She was a middle distance runner and won the 800 metres at the 1995 Asian Athletics Championships. She went on to win the bronze medal in 800 m and 1500 m events in the 1998 Asian Athletics Championships and gold medal in both the events in the Asian Games in Bangkok in 1998. She is a recipient of the Arjuna Award in 1995 and the Major Dhyan Chand Khel Ratna award for the year 1998–1999. She was awarded the Padma Shri in 2003.

Personal life
Sikdar was born on 11 December 1969 to Gurudas Sikdar and Nihar Sikdar in Debagram of Nadia district in West Bengal. She studied till Higher Secondary. Sikdar married Avtar Singh on 9 February 1994, with whom she has a son.

Achievements

References

External links
 Official biographical sketch in Parliament of India website

1969 births
Living people
People from Krishnagar
People from Nadia district
Sportswomen from West Bengal
Indian female middle-distance runners
20th-century Indian women
20th-century Indian people
Indian sportsperson-politicians
Women in West Bengal politics
Olympic athletes of India
Athletes (track and field) at the 1996 Summer Olympics
Asian Games gold medalists for India
Asian Games silver medalists for India
Asian Games medalists in athletics (track and field)
Athletes (track and field) at the 1994 Asian Games
Athletes (track and field) at the 1998 Asian Games
India MPs 2004–2009
Trinamool Congress politicians from West Bengal
Communist Party of India (Marxist) politicians from West Bengal
Recipients of the Khel Ratna Award
Recipients of the Padma Shri in sports
Recipients of the Arjuna Award
Lok Sabha members from West Bengal
21st-century Indian women politicians
21st-century Indian politicians
Women members of the Lok Sabha
Medalists at the 1998 Asian Games